The Big Issue is a street newspaper founded by John Bird and Gordon Roddick in September 1991 and published in four continents. The Big Issue is one of the UK's leading social businesses and exists to offer homeless people, or individuals at risk of homelessness, the opportunity to earn a legitimate income, thereby helping them to reintegrate into mainstream society. It is the world's most widely circulated street newspaper.

History
Inspired by Street News, a newspaper sold by homeless people in New York City, The Big Issue was founded in 1991 by John Bird and Gordon Roddick as a response to the increasing numbers of homeless people in London; they have been friends since 1967. The Body Shop provided start-up capital to the equivalent value of $50,000.  the magazine was initially published monthly but, in June 1993, The Big Issue went weekly. The venture continued to expand with national editions being established in Scotland and Wales, as well as regional editions for Northern England and England's South West Region. Further editions are also produced in seven locations overseas.

In 1995, The Big Issue Foundation was founded to offer additional support and advice to vendors around issues such as housing, health, personal finance and addiction.

Between 2007 and 2011, the circulation of The Big Issue declined from 167,000 to less than 125,000. Competition between vendors also increased at this time. From July 2011, the different regional editions were merged into a single UK-wide magazine. January 2012, the magazine was relaunched, with an increased focus on campaigning and political journalism. New columnists were added, including the Premier League footballer Joey Barton, Rachel Johnson, Mike Shinoda of Linkin Park and Samira Ahmed. The cover price was increased.

In 2016, The Big Issue celebrated surpassing 200 million magazine sales. In September 2021, the magazine celebrated its 30th birthday.

Ethos
The magazine is produced by the Big Issue Company Ltd. The company is a self-sustaining business that generates income through magazine sales and advertising revenues. Financially, The Big Issue is a social enterprise. The Big Issue Foundation is the registered charity arm of the organisation. It aims to underpin the company's work by tackling the underlying causes of homelessness.

Overseas projects
There are nine Big Issue projects by the same name in other nations.
 The Big Issue Australia (from June 1996)
 The Big Issue France (from October 1993): In France, a non-profit organisation named Big Issue France created with support from John Bird the magazine against exclusion called La Rue.
 The Big Issue Japan (from November 2003)
 The Big Issue Kenya (from 2007)
 The Big Issue Korea (from July 2010)
 The Big Issue Malawi (from 2009)
 The Big Issue Namibia
 The Big Issue The Republic of Ireland 
 The Big Issue South Africa (from December 1996)
 The Big Issue Taiwan (from April 2010)
 The Big Issue Zambia (from 2007)

Criticism

The Big Issue has been the centre of much controversy among publishers of street newspapers, mainly because of its business model.  Publishers of some other street newspapers, especially in the United States, have criticised it for being overly "commercial" and having a flashy design. According to these critics, street newspapers ought to focus on covering political and social issues that affect the homeless, rather than emulating mainstream newspapers to generate a profit. Publishers of some smaller papers, such as Making Change in Santa Monica, California, said they felt threatened when The Big Issue began to publish in their area. Other papers have also criticised The Big Issue for its professional production and limited participation by homeless individuals in writing and producing the newspaper.  Others, however, have stated that The Big Issue uses a successful business model to generate a profit to benefit the homeless, and its founder John Bird has said that it is "possible to be both profitable and ethically correct".

Awards 
 October 2004 – UN Habitat Scroll of Honour Award
 October 2008 – Ernst & Young Social Entrepreneur of the Year award

See also 
 Homelessness in the United Kingdom
 International Network of Street Papers
 Lucy Johnston

References

Further reading

External links

Official site
"Ethical Entrepreneurs" John Bird founder of The Big Issue, talks about his early life and entrepreneurial journey
Regional sites
빅이슈코리아
Northern England
Scotland
South West England
大誌雜誌中文版
Wales

Newspapers published in London
Political magazines published in the United Kingdom
Weekly magazines published in the United Kingdom
Street newspapers
Magazines established in 1991
1991 establishments in the United Kingdom
Homelessness in the United Kingdom